Saint-Quentin Basket-Ball, commonly known as Saint-Quentin BB, is a French basketball club playing in the LNB Pro B (second division championship of France), based in the commune of Saint-Quentin in the department of Aisne.

History
Saint-Quentin BB is born in 1973 from the merger of the Amicale Jumentier and Union sportive des Cheminots. The new club disputes the regional championship Excellence. In 1982, became a new merger between Saint-Quentin BB and Foyer laïque d'Harly. In 1988, Saint-Quentin BB accessed by 1A (now Pro A). The club then competed with the best teams in the league and finished fifth. In 1990 the club qualifies for the FIBA Korać Cup of the next season. They compete in 1991 with a home victory over the Greek powerhouse of Panathinaikos, but an away defeat. In 1993, following financial difficulties, Saint-Quentin relegated to National 4 and briefly found Pro B in 2000 (back down the following year) only to return in 2001 until 2009.
The team regularly attends the Playoffs, losing in the semifinals in 2006 (opposite Entente Orléanaise) and 2007 (facing Quimper).
SQBB part in the 2009 championship has NM1 2012.
The SQBB finishes first Championship of France of Men's National Basketball 1 2011-2012 and participated in the France Championship Basketball Pro B 2012-2013.

Honours & achievements
French League 3
 Winners (3): 1998-99, 2000–01, 2011–12
French Cup
 Winners (1): 1987
 Runners-up (1): 1985

Players

Retired numbers

Notable players

References

Basketball teams in France
Basketball teams established in 1973